Greatest Hits + Five Unreleased is a greatest hits compilation released by American singer/musician Steve Perry in 1998. The album contains hits from his two solo albums Street Talk (1984) and For the Love of Strange Medicine (1994) as well as several previously unreleased tracks from the abandoned solo project Against the Wall, as well as demos, b-sides and collaborations.

Against the Wall was originally going to be Perry's second solo album. It was shelved by a corporate executive during the time when Sony Music bought Columbia Records. Perry recalled the executive said he was unsure about the musical direction of the album.  Apparently stunned at this response, Perry sought legal means to have the album completed and released otherwise but was unsuccessful.  Sony ultimately did not release the album.  Seven of these tracks were later released on this album and the others were released as bonus tracks on the 2006 re-issue of For the Love of Strange Medicine. He states in the album booklet that these songs all together should be called "Better Late Than Never."

Track listing

References

External links
 Steve Perry – Greatest Hits at Discogs

1998 greatest hits albums
Steve Perry albums
Columbia Records compilation albums